The Bezirk Bludenz is an administrative district (Bezirk) in Vorarlberg, Austria.

Area of the district is 1,287.63 km², population is 61,407 (January 1, 2012), and population density 48 persons per km². Administrative center of the district is Bludenz.

Administrative divisions 
The district is divided into 29 municipalities, one of them is a town, and two of them are market towns.

Towns 
Bludenz (13,801)

Market towns 
Nenzing (5,976)
Schruns (3,683)

Municipalities 
 Bartholomäberg (2,281)
 Blons (324)
 Bludesch (2,220)
 Brand (666)
 Bürs (3,113)
 Bürserberg (528)
 Dalaas (1,512)
 Fontanella (433)
 Gaschurn (1,515)
 Innerbraz (933)
 Klösterle (690)
 Lech am Arlberg (1,636)
 Lorüns (281)
 Ludesch (3,375)
 Nüziders (4,880)
 Raggal (822)
 Sankt Anton im Montafon (751)
 Sankt Gallenkirch (2,190)
 Sankt Gerold (361)
 Silbertal (860)
 Sonntag (679)
 Stallehr (288)
 Thüringen (2,158)
 Thüringerberg (683)
 Tschagguns (2,169)
 Vandans (2,599)

(population numbers January 1, 2012)

 
Districts of Vorarlberg
Lechquellen Mountains
Verwall Alps